Ma Kai (pinyin: Mǎ Kǎi; born June 1946 in Shanghai) was one of the four Vice Premiers of China (Fourth-ranked). He was formerly a State Councilor and Secretary General of the State Council of China.

Biography
Ma Kai was born in Jinshan, Shanghai in 1946. He received his Master's degree from Renmin University of China in 1982.

His portfolio also includes putting forth Chinese policies with regard to global warming. He was a member of the 16th and the 17th Central Committee of the Chinese Communist Party, and then a member of the 18th.  He was elected to 18th Politburo of the Chinese Communist Party in 2012.

In 2003 he was given responsibility for the National Development and Reform Commission, an organisation which has broad administrative and planning control over the Economy of China.

In November 2017, Ma Kai was appointed to lead the Financial Stability and Development Commission (FSDC).

Personal life 
Ma Kai is also known as an accomplished poet.

References

External links 
 Official biography of Ma Kai

1946 births
People's Republic of China politicians from Shanghai
Renmin University of China alumni
Living people
Chinese Communist Party politicians from Shanghai
Vice Premiers of the People's Republic of China
Members of the 18th Politburo of the Chinese Communist Party
Beijing No. 4 High School alumni
State councillors of China